The 2006 All-Big 12 Conference football team consists of American football players chosen as All-Big 12 Conference players for the 2006 Big 12 Conference football season.  The conference recognizes two official All-Big 12 selectors: (1) the Big 12 conference coaches selected separate offensive and defensive units and named first- and second-team players (the "Coaches" team); and (2) a panel of sports writers and broadcasters covering the Big 12 also selected offensive and defensive units and named first- and second-team players (the "Media" team).

Offensive selections

Quarterbacks

 Zac Taylor, Nebraska (Coaches-1; Media-1)
 Chase Daniel, Missouri (Coaches-2)
 Colt McCoy, Texas (Media-2)

Running backs

 Jon Cornish, Kansas (Coaches-1; Media-1)
 Adrian Peterson, Oklahoma (Coaches-1; Media-2)
 Brandon Jackson, Nebraska (Coaches-2; Media-2)
 Jorvorskie Lane, Texas A&M (Coaches-2)
 Jamaal Charles, Texas (Media-2)

Centers

 Lyle Sendlein, Texas (Coaches-2; Media-1)
 David Ochoa, Kansas (Coaches-2; Media-2)
 Scott Stephenson, Iowa State (Coaches-2)
 Cody Wallace, Texas A&M (Coaches-2)
 Matt Slauson, Nebraska (Media-2)

Guards

 Kasey Studdard, Texas (Coaches-1; Media-1)
 Brian Daniels, Colorado (Media-2)
 Kirk Elder, Texas A&M (Media-2)
 Manuel Ramirez, Texas Tech (Media-2)

Tackles

 Justin Blalock, Texas (Coaches-1; Media-1)
 Corey Hilliard, Oklahoma State (Coaches-1; Media-1)
 Chris Messner, Oklahoma (Coaches-1; Media-1)
 Joel Clinger, Missouri (Coaches-1)
 Glenn January, Texas Tech (Coaches-2)

Tight ends

 Martin Rucker, Missouri (Coaches-1)
 Chase Coffman, Missouri (Media-1)
 Martellus Bennett, Texas A&M (Coaches-2; Media-2)

Receivers

 Adarius Bowman, Oklahoma State (Coaches-1; Media-1)
 Joel Filani, Texas Tech (Coaches-1; Media-1)
 Limas Sweed, Texas (Coaches-1; Media-2)
 Malcolm Kelly, Oklahoma (Coaches-2; Media-2)
 Chris Alexander, Texas A&M (Coaches-2)
 Maurice Purify, Nebraska (Coaches-2)
 Dominique Zeigler, Baylor (Coaches-2)

Defensive selections

Defensive linemen

 Ian Campbell, Kansas State (Coaches-1; Media-1)
 Adam Carriker, Nebraska (Coaches-1; Media-1)
 Abraham Wright, Colorado (Coaches-1; Media-1)
 Larry Birdine, Oklahoma (Coaches-1)
 C. J. Ah You, Oklahoma (Coaches-1)
 Tim Crowder, Texas (Coaches-2; Media-1)
 Keyunta Dawson, Texas Tech (Coaches-2; Media-2)
 Victor DeGrate, Oklahoma State (Coaches-2; Media-2)
 Jay Moore, Nebraska (Coaches-2)
 Brian Smith, Missouri (Coaches-2)
 Chris Harrington, Texas A&M (Media-2)
 James McClinton, Kansas (Media-2)

Linebackers

 Rufus Alexander, Oklahoma (Coaches-1; Media-1)
 Marcus Bacon, Missouri (Coaches-1; Media-1)
 Bo Ruud, Nebraska (Coaches-1)
 Brandon Archer, Kansas State (Coaches-2; Media-1)
 Alvin Bowen, Iowa State (Coaches-2; Media-1)
 Joe Pawelek, Baylor (Coaches-2)
 Jordon Dizon, Colorado (Media-2)
 Zach Latimer, Oklahoma (Media-2)
 Ty McKenzie, Iowa State (Media-2)
 Justin Warren, Texas A&M (Media-2)

Defensive backs

 Michael Griffin, Texas (Coaches-1; Media-1)
 Aaron Ross, Texas (Coaches-1; Media-1)
 Aqib Talib, Kansas (Coaches-1; Media-1)
 Melvin Bullitt, Texas A&M (Coaches-1; Media-2)
 Terrence Wheatley, Colorado (Coaches-1; Media-2)
 Reggie Smith, Oklahoma (Coaches-2; Media-1)
 David Overstreet, Missouri (Coaches-2; Media-2)
 Nic Harris, Oklahoma (Coaches-2)
 Marcus Watt, Kansas State (Coaches-2)
 Marcus Walker, Oklahoma (Coaches-2)
 C. J. Wilson, Baylor (Media-2)

Special teams

Kickers

 Mason Crosby, Colorado (Coaches-1; Media-1)
 Garrett Hartley, Oklahoma (Coaches-2; Media-2)

Punters

 Daniel Sepulveda, Baylor (Coaches-1; Media-1)
 Matt Fodge, Oklahoma State (Coaches-2; Media-2)

All-purpose / Return specialists

 Yamon Figurs, Kansas State (Coaches-1)
 Shannon Woods, Texas Tech (Media-1)
 Aaron Ross, Texas (Coaches-2)
 Perrish Cox, Oklahoma State (Media-2)
 Marlon Lucky, Nebraska (Media-2)

Key
Bold = selected as a first-team player by both the coaches and media panel

Coaches = selected by Big 12 Conference coaches

Media = selected by a media panel

See also
2006 College Football All-America Team

References

All-Big 12 Conference
All-Big 12 Conference football teams